Bette Smith is an American soul, rock and blues singer who releases music on the Ruf Records blues label. Of Trinidadian descent, she is a New York Blues Hall of Fame inductee best known for her albums Jetlagger and The Good, the Bad and the Bette and for her work with Jimbo Mathus, Kirk Fletcher, Luther Dickinson and Patterson Hood. She tours extensively on the North American blues festival circuit and in Europe.

Early life

Sharon Meriel Kathleen Smith, known professionally as Bette Smith, grew up in the Bedford-Stuyvesant neighborhood of Brooklyn, New York. Her parents are Trinidadian. Her father, a choir director in the Seventh Day Adventist church the family attended, taught her to sing. She sang featured roles in the church's gospel choir.

Career

2010s
She released an album called From The Well Of My Inner Child in 2006 using the stage name "Bette Stuy." She graduated from Le Cordon Bleu College of Culinary Arts in Los Angeles in 2010, and studied at The New School in New York City, where in 2014 she earned a B.S. in Liberal Arts with an emphasis on Creative Arts Therapy, and at Columbia’s School of Social Work. To earn a living she worked as a receptionist and on Wall Street.

She was inducted into the New York Blues Hall of Fame in 2012.

In 2013 her older brother Louis, dying of kidney failure, urged her to further pursue her dreams of becoming a professional full-time singer. Again using the name Bette Stuy, she released in 2015 the EP Introducing Bette Stuy: This is Neo Blues, put together a band, and continued playing at New York City clubs and on the street.

A musician who knew Jimbo Mathus of the Squirrel Nut Zippers heard her singing at a street fair and put her in touch with Mathus. Mathus decided he wanted to work with her. She went to Mississippi with him and, with a live band, they recorded her debut album as Bette Smith, Jetlagger.

On 26 July 2017 Billboard premiered the video for the track "Manchild." Jetlagger was released on 29 September 2017 on Big Legal Mess Records (a subsidiary of Fat Possum). It included original songs as well as covers by the Staples Singers and Isaac Hayes.

In 2018 WNYC Studios' Radiolab invited her to contribute an original song to its compilation project called 27: The Most Perfect Album, with each track inspired by one of the 27 U.S. Constitutional amendments. She chose the 13th Amendment and contributed her song "Happy Warrior."

Jetlagger received reviews in major publications. BrooklynVegan premiered the video and PopMatters the audio for the track "I Found Love."

Smith toured in Europe promoting the album, appearing in 2018 at the Montreux Jazz Festival in Switzerland and festivals in Spain, France and The Netherlands. She toured Europe again in July 2019.

2020s
Together with Kirk Fletcher she released the single "Dance Monkey" on Cleopatra Records on 6 February 2020. Also that year the same label released her single with Jesse Johnson, "Memories." The second Bette Smith album, The Good, the Bad and the Bette, came out on 25 September 2020 on blues label Ruf Records.

Produced by Drive-By Truckers’ Matt Patton and engineer Bronson Tew, The Good, the Bad and the Bette included three songs co-written by Smith and includes contributions from Luther Dickinson from North Mississippi Allstars and Patterson Hood from Drive-By Truckers. Jim DeRogatis included it on his “Best Albums of 2020” list. The track "Fistful of Dollars" reached #1 on the Roots Music Report in April 2021.
Her bookings in summer and fall 2021 included U.S. tours with the Drive-By Truckers and Kenny Wayne Shepherd, an appearance at the Telluride Blues & Brews Festival, and her own "Bustin’ Out of Brooklyn Tour ‘21." In 2022 she performed at the Kennedy Center. Her studio collaborations in 2020 and 2021 included tracks with Joe Louis Walker, Larry Brown, Fabrizio Grossi & Soul Garage Experience, and others.

On 25 February 2022 she and Kirk Fletcher released another single on Cleopatra Records, a cover of the Rolling Stones' "Brown Sugar." Her summer 2022 festival bookings included Mempho Music Festival, Calgary Folk Music Festival, Blues From The Top Festival, and Kitchener Blues Festival.

Discography

Albums

Singles as artist

Singles/tracks as featured artist

Personal life
Bette Smith lives in Brooklyn, New York. She is a cousin of gospel singer Wintley Phipps.

References

American blues singers
African-American rock singers
American soul singers
Year of birth missing (living people)
Living people
American women rock singers
21st-century African-American women singers
People from Bedford–Stuyvesant, Brooklyn
Musicians from Brooklyn
American Seventh-day Adventists
Alumni of Le Cordon Bleu
The New School alumni